The 1998 Fordham Rams football team was an American football team that represented Fordham University during the 1998 NCAA Division I-AA football season. Fordham finished fifth in the Patriot League. 

In their first and only year under head coach Ken O'Keefe, the Rams compiled a 4–7 record. Cliff Moseley and Steve O'Hare were the team captains.

The Rams were outscored 336 to 252. Their 2–4 conference record placed fifth in the seven-team Patriot League standings. 

Fordham played its home games at Jack Coffey Field on the university campus in The Bronx, in New York City.

Schedule

References

Fordham
Fordham Rams football seasons
Fordham Rams football